Joy Nunieh is a Nigerian lawyer and former managing director of Niger Delta Development Commission. She was sacked on 19 February 2020 by President Buhari and replaced immediately by Kemebradikumo Pondei. Nunieh was at the centre of NDDC scandal which laid allegations against Goodswill Akpabio.

References 

Living people
People from Rivers State
Rivers State University alumni
21st-century Nigerian lawyers
Year of birth missing (living people)